Sanford Soverhill Atwood (1912 – December 2, 2002) was an American scientist with a specialty in cell biology & plant breeding and academic administrator.

Born in Janesville, Wisconsin, Atwood earned his bachelors, masters and Phd from the University of Wisconsin–Madison.  He worked as a Professor of Plant Breeding at Cornell University, and then served as Cornell's Provost.  He left Cornell to become president of Emory University, where he served from 1963 to 1977.  Under his administration, Emory's faculty size doubled, the student body grew by over 60%, invited Emory's first African American commencement speaker (Benjamin Mays) and first woman commencement speaker (Rosemary Park) and famously stood by Professor Thomas J. J. Altizer after his controversial writings.

References

External links
 Sanford S. Atwood at the Stuart A. Rose Manuscript, Archives, and Rare Book Library

1912 births
2002 deaths
People from Janesville, Wisconsin
American agronomists
Cornell University faculty
Presidents of Emory University
University of Wisconsin–Madison College of Agricultural and Life Sciences alumni
20th-century American academics
20th-century agronomists